TGFB1-induced anti-apoptotic factor 1 is a protein that in humans is encoded by the TIAF1 gene.

Interactions 

TIAF1 has been shown to interact with Janus kinase 3 and TRIB3.

References

Further reading